Dreamland Recording Studios is a residential recording studio located in the town of Hurley, New York. Opened in 1986 as a recording facility, the studio is housed in what was once St. John's Church built in 1896.

Some of the artists that recorded and produced at Dreamland include The B-52's, Joan Jett, Ace Frehley, Misfits, Bad Brains, The Breeders, Nick Cave and The Bad Seeds, Fleet Foxes, Yo-Yo Ma and Bobby McFerrin, Suzanne Vega, Dinosaur Jr., Buffalo Tom, 10,000 Maniacs, Jack DeJohnette, Joe Jackson, The Mighty Mighty Bosstones, Sunny Day Real Estate, The Connells among many others, and more recently The National, Parquet Courts, Jack and Amanda Palmer, Beach House, Kurt Vile and many more.

All of the vintage recording gear and instruments that were used from the time of the studio foundation are still in use today. The centerpiece of the control room is a custom built 48 channel in-line API Legacy fit with Neve Flying Faders II.

Dreamland still includes its full accommodation facilities for large groups, which enabled many artists to hold residency sessions at the studio.

Today, the studio is managed by renowned drummer and composer Jerry Marotta.

References

External links 

Recording studios in New York (state)
1986 establishments in New York (state)